Hard Knock Life may refer to:

 "It's the Hard Knock Life", a song from the musical Annie
 Vol. 2... Hard Knock Life, a 1998 album by Jay-Z
 "Hard Knock Life (Ghetto Anthem)", a song from the album, which samples the showtune from Annie